The Summer Street Bridge is a retractile bridge built in 1899 in Boston, Massachusetts, over the Fort Point Channel. It still stands, but the draw was welded shut and the motors removed in 1970. It was the site of a terrible streetcar crash on the night of November 7, 1916. When documented by the Historic American Engineering Record in 1984, the Summer Street Bridge was one of only four retractile drawbridges left in the US, two of which were on Summer Street in Boston. The other Summer Street bridge, over Reserved Channel, was replaced in 2003.

See also
List of bridges documented by the Historic American Engineering Record in Massachusetts

References

External links

Bridges completed in 1899
Historic American Engineering Record in Massachusetts
Retractable bridges